Samuel Edward Winbolt (1868–1944) was a British classics and history teacher, author and amateur archaeologist.

He was educated at Christ's Hospital and Corpus Christi College, Oxford, where he subsequently returned as a master in classics and history. Whilst there he published some educational editions of the classics and other works on history and English literature. His classical training naturally turned his attention to Roman history and archaeology, which led him to spend much time in British and continental museums, and on which he gave BBC talks.

He began practical archaeological excavations in 1922, and went on to unearth four Roman villas, a Romano-Celtic Temple on Farley Heath, Surrey and two Roman posting stations, made countless sections of Roman roads and found and dug a score of medieval glasshouse sites. Added to this he investigated six Early Iron Age camps in Sussex, Surrey and Kent. He also wrote four titles in the Penguin Guides series, which provided post-war touring guides to the English counties.

Bibliography

References 

1868 births
1944 deaths
People educated at Christ's Hospital
Alumni of Corpus Christi College, Oxford
Christ's Hospital staff
English archaeologists
English classical scholars